Imamkhan Magometgireyevich Gazdiyev (born 27 December 1993) is a former Russian football midfielder.

Club career
He made his debut in the Russian Second Division for FC Angusht Nazran on 26 July 2012 in a game against FC Torpedo Armavir. He made his Russian Football National League debut for Angusht on 14 April 2014 in a game against FC SKA-Energiya Khabarovsk.

References

External links
 
 
 Career summary by sportbox.ru

1993 births
Living people
Russian footballers
Association football midfielders
FC Angusht Nazran players